Flyby may refer to:

 Flypast or flyover, a celebratory display or ceremonial flight
 Flyby (spaceflight), a spacecraft concept
 Planetary flyby, a type of interplanetary spacecraft mission
 Gravity assist, a spaceflight maneuver
 Fly-by, circuit topology used in DDR3 SDRAM memory technology
 Flyby AB, a Swedish airline offering sightseeing tours

Music
 Flybys (album), a 2003 album by The Curtains
 "Fly By" or "Fly By II", a 2001 song by English boy band Blue
 "Fly Bi", a 2000 UK garage song by Teebone featuring MC Kie & MC Sparks

See also
Fly-by-wire, electrically signaled flight control systems
 Flybuys (disambiguation)

it:Fly-by